William Joseph Frohbose (born May 20, 1952) is a former American football safety who played in the National Football League for one season. He played college football at the University of Miami and was signed by the Detroit Lions as an undrafted free agent in 1974.

High school career
Frohbose was a standout defensive back at Archbishop Curley-Notre Dame in Miami. A 1969 graduate, Frohbose was named as one of Miami-Dade's best football players of all time by the Miami Herald in 2008.

Frohbose went on to play college football for four seasons at the University of Miami.

Professional career
Frohbose signed with the Detroit Lions as an undrafted free agent following the 1974 NFL Draft. Frohbose was activated to Detroit's roster on December 5, and played in the team's final two games of the season against the Cincinnati Bengals and Philadelphia Eagles.

References

External links
 Pro Football Archives bio

1952 births
Living people
Players of American football from Washington, D.C.
Players of American football from Miami
American football safeties
Miami Hurricanes football players
Detroit Lions players
Archbishop Curley-Notre Dame High School alumni